Worker representation on corporate boards of directors, also known as board-level employee representation (BLER) refers to the right of workers to vote for representatives on a board of directors in corporate law. In 2018, a majority of Organisation for Economic Co-operation and Development, and a majority of countries in the European Union, had some form of law guaranteeing the right of workers to vote for board representation. Together with a right to elect work councils, this is often called "codetermination".

Overview

The following is a list of 35 countries in the Organisation for Economic Co-operation and Development and their practices of worker representation on corporate boards of directors.

History
Some of the first codetermination laws emerged in universities in the UK during the 19th century, such as the Oxford University Act 1854 and the Cambridge University Act 1856. Further Acts included the South Metropolitan Gas Act 1896 and the Port of London Act 1908. In Germany, there were experiments with worker representation through work councils over the late 19th century, after the first attempts to introduce worker voice by an ex-member of the Frankfurt Parliament named Carl Degenkolb. At the end of World War I, the German trade unions made an historic collective agreement with representatives of German business for full partnership in economic management throughout the country. This was put into the Weimar Constitution article 165, and resulted in a work council law in 1920, and a board representation law in 1922. The fascist government abolished codetermination in 1934, but after World War II, German unions again made collective agreements to resurrect work councils and board representation. These agreements were codified in law in 1951 and 1952.

In most countries around Europe, different forms board representation law spread slowly, especially from the 1970s. In the UK there were repeated experiments from iron and steel to the post office, with worker directors. However, after the Bullock Report of 1977 failed to pass and Margaret Thatcher won the 1979 election, almost all worker participation was ended. Germany recast and extended its laws in 1972 and 1976. The European Commission did propose a Draft Fifth Company Law Directive, but it did not complete passage. In the United States, growing interest in worker "involvement" through Scanlon plans led to unions such as the United Steelworkers at Chrysler, or at United Airlines to negotiate board representation, although usually this was forcibly linked to employee share schemes. Notably, the share scheme at Enron failed in 2003. Almost all modern worker representation laws enable votes without any requirement to invest money. In 2013, France became the largest country to create a modern board representation law to mandate workers with equal rights to all other directors to be on boards.

See also
Co-determination
Cooperative
Worker cooperative
Employee stock ownership
European labour law and European company law
UK labour law and UK company law
German labour law
French labour law
Indian labour law
US labor law and US corporate law
Market socialism
Social ownership

Notes

References
J Waddington (ed.), 'European board-level employee representation: national variations in influence and power' (2018), Kluwer Law international editions 
J Waddington, A Conchon, 'Board-level employee representation in Europe: priorities, power and articulation' (2016), Routledge edition 
I Ferreras, Firms as Political Entities: Saving Democracy through Economic Bicameralism (2017)
TH Hammer, SC Currall and RN Stern, ‘Worker Representation on Boards of Directors: A Study of Competing Roles’ (1991) 44(4) Industrial and Labor Relations Review 661-680 
LW Hunter, ‘Can Strategic Participation be Institutionalized? Union Representation on American Corporate Boards’ (1998) 51(4) Industrial and Labor Relations Review 557-578
E McGaughey, 'Democracy in America at Work: The History of Labor's Vote in Corporate Governance' (2019) 42 Seattle University Law Review 697 
E McGaughey, 'The Codetermination Bargains: The History of German Corporate and Labour Law' (2016) 23(1) Columbia Journal of European Law 135 
E McGaughey, 'Votes at Work in Britain: Shareholder Monopolisation and the ‘Single Channel’' (2017) 46(4) Industrial Law Journal 444 
RB McKersie, ‘Union-Nominated Directors: A New Voice in Corporate Governance’ (1 April 1999) MIT Working Paper
RB McKersie, ‘Labor's voice at the strategic level of the firm’ (2001) 7 Transfer: European Review of Labour and Research 480
HJ Teuteberg, ‘Zur Entstehungsgeschichte der ersten betrieblichen Arbeitervertretungen in Deutschland’ (1960) 11 Soziale Welt 69
HJ Teuteberg, Geschichte der Industriellen Mitbestimmung in Deutschland (1961)
S Webb and B Webb, Industrial Democracy (1920)
S Webb and B Webb, The History of Trade Unionism (1920) Appendix VIII

External links
worker-participation.eu 
Z Adams, L Bishop and S Deakin, CBR Labour Regulation Index (Dataset of 117 Countries) (Cambridge: Centre for Business Research 2016))

Democracy
Human resource management
Labour law
Corporate law
Board of directors